The GeForce 9 series is the ninth generation of Nvidia's GeForce series of graphics processing units, the first of which was released on February 21, 2008.  Products are based on a slightly repolished Tesla microarchitecture, adding PCIe 2.0 support, improved color and z-compression, and built on a 65 nm process, later using 55 nm process to reduce power consumption and die size (GeForce 8 G8x GPUs only supported PCIe 1.1 and were built on 90 nm process or 80 nm process).

GeForce 9300 Series

Geforce 9100 G 
 65 nm G98 GPU
 PCI-E x16
 64-bit bus
 4 raster operations pipelines (ROP), 8 unified shaders
 540 MHz core clock
 256 MB DDR2, 400 MHz memory clock
 1300 MHz shader clock
 5.1 G texels/s fill rate
 7.6 GB/s memory bandwidth
 Supports DirectX 10, SM 4.0
 OpenGL 2.1 compliance
 Supports 1st generation PureVideo HD technology with partial VC1 decoding

Geforce 9300 GS 
On May 1, 2008, the GeForce 9300 GS was officially launched.

 80 nm G86 GPU
 PCI-E x16
 64-bit bus
 8 ROP, 16 unified shaders
 450 MHz core clock
 512 MB DDR2, 400 MHz memory clock
 900 MHz shader clock
 3.6 Gtexels/s fill rate
 6.4 GB/s memory bandwidth
 Supports DirectX 10, SM 4.0
 OpenGL 2.1 compliance

GeForce 9400 Series

GeForce 9400 GT
On August 27, 2008, the GeForce 9400 GT was officially launched.

65 nm G96 GPU
16 stream processors
550 MHz core, with a 1350 MHz unified shader clock
4.4 Gtexels/s fillrate
256/512/1024 MB 800 MHz DDR2 or 256 MB 1600 MHz GDDR3, both with a 128-bit memory bus
12.8 GB/s memory bandwidth for boards configured with DDR2 800 MHz memory
Supports DirectX 10, Shader Model 4.0, OpenGL 3.3, and PCI-Express 2.0
Supports 2nd generation PureVideo HD technology with partial VC1 decoding and HybridPower technology.
Minimum of 300 watt power supply

GeForce 9500 Series

GeForce 9500 GT

On July 29, 2008, the GeForce 9500 GT was officially launched.

65 nm G96 GPU
32 stream processors (32 CUDA cores)
4 multi processors (each multi processor has 8 cores)
550 MHz core, with a 1400 MHz unified shader clock
8.8 Gtexels/s fillrate
256/512/1024 MB 1,600 MHz GDDR3 memory or 256 MB/512 MB 1,000 MHz GDDR2 memory, both with a 128-bit memory bus
25.6 GB/s memory bandwidth for boards configured with GDDR3 800 MHz memory
Supports DirectX 10, Shader Model 4.0, OpenGL 3.3, and PCI-Express 2.0
Supports 2nd generation PureVideo HD technology with partial VC1 decoding
NVIDIA SLI-ready technology
DVI support

GeForce 9500 GS
The 9500 GS is an OEM card that is based on the 9500 GT but geared towards the mainstream audience.

65 nm G96 GPU
32 stream processors
8 ROP units
550 MHz core, with a 1375 MHz defined unified shader clock
8.8 Gtexels/s fillrate
128/512 MB 1000 MHz DDR2 memory with a 128-bit memory bus
16.0 GB/s memory bandwidth
Supports DirectX 10, Shader Model 4.0, OpenGL 3.3, and PCI-Express 2.0
Supports 2nd generation PureVideo HD technology with partial VC1 decoding
NVIDIA SLI-ready technology
DVI support

GeForce 9600 series

GeForce 9600 GT 

On February 21, 2008, the GeForce 9600 GT was officially launched. It was an upgrade of 8600 GTS.

65 nm G94 GPU
64 stream processors
16 raster operation (ROP) units, 32 texture address (TA) / texture filter (TF) units
20.8 Gtexels/s fill rate
650 MHz core clock, with a 1625 MHz unified shader clock
1008 MHz memory (2016 MHz datarate), 256-bit interface for 64.5GB/s of bandwidth. (57.6 GB/s for 1800 MHz configuration)
512–2048 MB of GDDR3 or DDR2 memory
505M transistor count
DirectX 10.0, Shader Model 4.0, OpenGL 2.1, and PCI-Express 2.0
Supports second-generation PureVideo HD technology with partial VC1 decoding
Is HDCP compatible, but its implementation depends on the manufacturer
Supports CUDA and the Quantum Effects physics processing engine
Almost double the performance of the previous Nvidia mid-range card, the GeForce 8600GTS

GeForce 9600 GS 

The GeForce 9600GS is a Hewlett Packard OEM card. It is based on a G94a core clocked at 500 MHz. It features 768 MB of DDR2 memory on a 192-bit bus.

GeForce 9600 GSO 
The GeForce 9600 GSO was essentially a renamed 8800 GS. This tactic has been seen before in products such as the GeForce 7900 GTO to clear unsold stock when it is made obsolete by the next generation. Just like the 8800 GS, the 9600 GSO features 96 stream processors, a 550 MHz core clock with shaders clocked at 1,375 MHz, and either 384 or 768 MB of memory clocked at 800 MHz on a 192-bit memory bus. Some manufacturers have mistakenly listed some of their 768 MB models that have 96 stream processors as being based on the G94 chip, rather than the G92.

GeForce 9600 GSO 512 
After clearing the old 8800 GS stock, Nvidia revised the specification with a new core, and 512 MB of memory clocked at 900 MHz on a 256-bit bus. For these cards, the number of stream processors is halved to 48, with the core frequency increased to 650 MHz and the shader frequency increased to 1625 MHz. Some of these cards have 1024 megabytes of memory while still being a 512 model. The revised version is considered inferior in performance to the old version.

GeForce 9600 GTX 
XFX released a 9600 GTX based on the G92 chip featuring 96 stream processors, a 580 MHz core clock, 1450 MHz shaders and 512 MB of GDDR3 running at 1400 MHz on a 256-bit bus. Other than clock speeds, it is functionally the desktop equivalent version of the 9800M GT.

GeForce 9800 Series 
The GeForce 9800 series contains the GX2 (dual GPU), GTX, GTX+ and GT variants.

GeForce 9800 GX2

On March 18, 2008, the GeForce 9800 GX2 was officially launched.

The GeForce 9800 GX2 has the following specifications: 
Dual PCBs, dual GPU design
197 W power consumption.
Two 65nm process GPUs, with 256 total stream processors (128 per PCB).
Supports Quad SLI
Power of Two underclocked GeForce 8800 GTS 512 (G92) video cards in SLI Mode
1 GiB (512 MiB per PCB) GDDR3 memory
Supports DirectX 10, Shader Model 4, OpenGL 3.3, and PCI-Express 2.0
Supports 2nd generation PureVideo HD technology with partial VC1 decoding
Outputs include two DVI ports, an HDMI output, and S/PDIF in connector on board for routing audio through the HDMI cable
An 8-pin and a 6-pin power connector
Clocks (Core/Shader/Memory): 600 MHz/1500 MHz/2000 MHz
256-bit memory interface
128 GB/s memory bandwidth
Release date: March 18, 2008
Launch price of $666.99

GeForce 9800 GTX

On April 1, 2008, the GeForce 9800 GTX was officially launched.

Taken from an eVGA specification sheet:

128 CUDA cores
Clocks (Core/Shader/Memory): 675 MHz/1688 MHz/1100 MHz
256-bit memory interface
512 MB of GDDR3 memory
70.4 GB/s memory bandwidth
Texture Fill Rate of 43.2 (billion/s)
DirectX 10, Shader Model 4.0, OpenGL 3.3, and PCI-Express 2.0
Supports 2nd generation PureVideo HD technology with partial VC1 decoding
Outputs include two DVI ports, an HDMI output (using Nvidia DVI to HDMI adapter (included)), and S/PDIF in connector on board for routing audio through the HDMI cable
Release date: 2008-04-01
Launch Price of $349

In July 2008 Nvidia released a refresh of the 9800 GTX: the 9800 GTX+ (55 nm manufacturing process).  It has faster core (738 MHz) and shader (1836 MHz) clocks. Since March 2009 this design is manufactured as GeForce GTS 250.

GeForce 9800 GT

The 9800GT is identical to an 8800GT, although some were manufactured using a 55 nm technology instead of the 65 nm technology debuted on the 8800GT. The newer (55 nm) version supports HybridPower while the 65 nm version does not.

ASUSTeK have released a 9800GT with Tri-SLI support.

Taken from the Nvidia product detail page.

112 CUDA cores
512–1024 MB of GDDR3 memory
256-bit memory interface width
600 MHz graphics clock
1500 MHz processor clock
900 MHz memory clock
33.6 Gtexel/s texture fill rate
57.6 GB/s memory bandwidth
Supports DirectX 10, Shader Model 4.0, OpenGL 3.3, and PCI-Express 2.0
Supports 2nd generation PureVideo HD technology with partial VC1 decoding

Technical Summary of Desktop G9x GPUs 

1 Unified shaders : Texture mapping units : Render output units

Features
 Compute Capability: 1.1 has support for Atomic functions, which are used to write thread-safe programs.

GeForce 9M Series 
All graphical processing units in the GeForce 9M series feature:
Increased performance for similar power draw compared to GeForce 8M series for midrange and mid-high range notebooks
DirectX 10.0 and OpenGL 3.3 compatibility
16X antialiasing and PCI-Express 2.0 connectivity
Full HD DVD / Blu-ray hardware decoding

9100M G 
1 TMU per pipeline
4 ROPs
8 stream processors
16 (v4.0) shader unified
26 GigaFLOPS
450 MHz core clock
1100 MHz shader clock
Integrated RAMDAC clock at 400 MHz
Memory clock depends on system memory
Up to 256 MB shared memory, 512 MB with Turbo Cache in Windows XP
64 bit memory interface (single-channel mode) / 128 bit memory interface (dual-channel mode)
Memory bandwidth depend on System Memory
1.8 Gtexels/s texture fill rate
 (Specification based on Acer Aspire 4530 using EVEREST Ultimate Edition Version 4.60.1500PX and TechPowerUp GPU-Z v0.4.6)

9200M GS 
8 stream processors
529 MHz core clock
1300 MHz shader clock
400 MHz memory clock
Up to 256 MB memory
64-bit memory interface
6.4 GB/s memory bandwidth
27.1 Gpixel/s pixel fill rate
4.2 Gtexel/s texture fill rate

9300M G 
16 stream processors
400 MHz core clock
800 MHz shader clock
600 MHz memory clock
Up to 512 MB memory
64-bit memory interface
1.8 GB/s memory bandwidth
3.2 Gtexels/s texture fill rate

9300M GS 
8 stream processors
580 MHz core clock
1450 MHz shader clock
800 MHz memory clock
Up to 512 MB memory
64-bit memory interface
6.9 GB/s memory bandwidth
4.6 Gtexels/s texture fill rate

9400M G 
16 stream processors
Memory clock depends on system memory
64 bit memory interface (single-channel mode) / 128 bit memory interface (dual-channel mode)
Memory bandwidth depends on System Memory
3.6 Gtexels/s texture fill rate

9500M G 
16 stream processors
500 MHz core clock
1250 MHz shader clock
800 MHz memory clock
Up to 1024 MB memory
128-bit memory interface
25.6 GB/s memory bandwidth
4.0 Gtexels/s texture fill rate

9500M GS 
32 stream processors
475 MHz core clock
950 MHz shader clock
700 MHz memory clock
Up to 512 MB memory
128-bit memory interface
22.4 GB/s memory bandwidth
7.6 Gtexels/s texture fill rate

9600M GS 
064A/8 core (G96)
32 stream processors
430 MHz core clock
1075 MHz shader clock
800/1600 MHz memory clock (effective)
Up to 1024 MB memory
128-bit memory interface
12.8 GB/s (with DDR2 type) or 25.6 GB/s (with GDDR3 type) memory bandwidth
6.8 Gtexels/s texture fill rate
103 GigaFLOPS

9600M GT 
32 stream processors
500 MHz core clock
1250 MHz shader clock
800 MHz memory clock
Up to 1024 MB memory
128-bit memory interface
25.6 GB/s memory bandwidth
8.0 Gtexels/s texture fill rate

9650M GT 
G96 core (65/55 nm)
32 stream processors
550 MHz core clock
1325 MHz shader clock
800 MHz memory clock
Up to 1024 MB memory
128 bit memory interface
25.6 GB/s memory bandwidth
8.8 Gtexels/s texture fill rate

9700M GT 
G96 core
32 stream processors
625 MHz core clock
1550 MHz shader clock
800 MHz memory clock
128 bit memory interface
25.6 GB/s memory bandwidth
10.0 Gtexels/s texture fill rate
148.8 GigaFLOPS

9700M GTS 
G94 core
48 stream processors
530 MHz core clock
1325 MHz shader clock
800 MHz memory clock
256 bit memory interface
51.2 GB/s memory bandwidth
12.7 Gtexels/s texture fill rate
190.8 GigaFLOPS

9800M GS 
G94 core
64 stream processors
530 MHz core clock
1325 MHz shader clock
800 MHz memory clock
256 bit memory interface
51.2 GB/s memory bandwidth
17.0 Gtexels/s texture fill rate
254 GigaFLOPS

9800M GTS 
G94 core
64 stream processors
600 MHz core clock
1500 MHz shader clock
800 MHz memory clock
256 bit memory interface
51.2 GB/s memory bandwidth
19.2 Gtexels/s texture fill rate
288 GigaFLOPS

9800M GT 
G94 core
96 stream processors
500 MHz core clock
1250 MHz shader clock
800 MHz memory clock
256 bit memory interface
51.2 GB/s memory bandwidth
24.0 Gtexels/s texture fill rate
360 GigaFLOPS

9800M GTX 
G92 core
112 stream processors
500 MHz core clock
1250 MHz shader clock
800 MHz memory clock
256 bit memory interface
51.2 GB/s memory bandwidth
28.0 Gtexels/s texture fill rate
420 GigaFLOPS

Technical summary

Discontinued support 

NVIDIA has ceased driver support for GeForce 9 series on April 1, 2016.

 Windows XP 32-bit & Media Center Edition: version 340.52 released on July 29, 2014; Download
 Windows XP 64-bit: version 340.52 released on July 29, 2014; Download
 Windows Vista, 7, 8, 8.1 32-bit: version 342.01 (WHQL) released on December 14, 2016; Download
 Windows Vista, 7, 8, 8.1 64-bit: version 342.01 (WHQL) released on December 14, 2016; Download
 Windows 10, 32-bit: version 342.01 (WHQL) released on December 14, 2016; Download
 Windows 10, 64-bit: version 342.01 (WHQL) released on December 14, 2016; Download

See also
 Comparison of Nvidia graphics processing units
 GeForce 8 series
 GeForce 100 series
 GeForce 200 series
 GeForce 300 series
 Nvidia Quadro NVIDIA's workstation graphics solution
 Nvidia Tesla NVIDIA's first dedicated general purpose GPU (graphical processor unit)

References

External links

 GeForce 9800 GX2
 GeForce 9800 GTX+
 GeForce 9800 GTX
 GeForce 9800 GT
 GeForce 9600 GT
 GeForce 9500 GT
 GeForce 9400 GT
 Nvidia Nsight

9 Series
Graphics cards
Computer-related introductions in 2008